Lusty gallant is a colour that originated in 16th century Elizabethan England. Named after a popular Tudor dance (which in turn came from a ballad), it is a shade of light pink.

The connection between the colour and dance is unknown. However, Lusty gallant's name is said to have come from the practice of dressmakers attempting to catch consumer's attention with eccentric colour names. It proved effective and Lusty gallant became a popular choice for dresses. The oldest surviving mention of the colour is William Harrison's 1577 book The Description of England, in which he describes it as a hue "devised to please fantastical heads".

References 

Shades of pink